Clinidium rojasi is a species of ground beetle in the subfamily Rhysodinae. It was described by Louis Alexandre Auguste Chevrolat in 1873. It is known from the mountains of northern Venezuela between Falcón and Aragua states and from Guyana.

Clinidium rojasi measure  in length.

References

Clinidium
Beetles of South America
Invertebrates of Guyana
Invertebrates of Venezuela
Beetles described in 1873
Taxa named by Louis Alexandre Auguste Chevrolat